The 2011 Africa Cup was the eleventh edition of this tournament. The competition has been restructured into several tiers, based on the IRB rankings.

The top sixteen teams played in Division 1, which is divided into four groups of four teams. The remaining teams played in Division 2.

Group 1A
Group 1A will be held from 7–12 November in Kenya.

The teams competing in Group 1A:
 
  (withdrew)
  (withdrew)
 

  and  relegated in division 1/B for 2012 Africa Cup

Group 1B
Group 1B was held from 12–18 June in Uganda.
The teams competing:
  (withdrew)
 
  
 

 Uganda and Zimbabwe promoted to pool A of 2012 Africa Cup

 Ivory Coast relegated too poll C of 2012 Africa Cup

Group 1C
Group 1C was held from 21–25 June in Cameroon.
The teams competing :
 
 
 
 

Semi-Finals

Third place play-off

Final

 Senegal promoted to div. 1/B of 2012 Africa Cup

Group 1D
Group 1D was held on 29 July in South Africa.
The teams competing :
 
 
  (withdrew and did not play any of its fixtures)
  (withdrew and did not play any of its fixtures)

Division 2 (North)

Division 2 (North) was held from 23–30 July in Mali.

The teams competing in Division 2 (North):
 
 
 
 
 
 
 
 

Quarter Finals

Semi-Finals - 5th place-play-off

Semi-Finals

Seventh place play-off

Fifth place play-off

Third place play-off

Final

Division 2 (South)

Division 2 (South) was held from 9–16 October in Rwanda.

The teams competing in Division 2 (South):
 
  withdrew
  withdrew

See also
Africa Cup

2011
2011 rugby union tournaments for national teams
2011 in African rugby union